Barnala is a city in the state of Punjab of India. Barnala city serves as the headquarters of the Barnala district which was formed in 2006. Prior to formation of Barnala district, this city was located in Sangrur district. It is situated near Bathinda.

History
 
Sikh historian Giani has recorded the details of setting up of Barnala in the annals of Khalsa in this manner that in the year 1775 Baba Ala Singh after offering Bhadaur (set up by King Padhar Sain) to his brother Duna Singh came to Barnala region which was lying aloof at that time. Setting it up, he made it his capital and took under his control surrounding villages. It too appears that Anahatgarh may be existing before and must have been deserted following attacks of Dharvis.
 
There are different opinions about the nomenclature of Barnala. Some are of the view, Vaaran being a region because of frequent storms was at that time also called Varna. So Barnala was called a land of too many storms which later on became Barnala because of precision of example. Another view reveals that a fort here is said to be built by Baba Ala Singh And Baba Anahat khan in which there was a ‘Baahuli’ (a well which had stairs going down). That too due to precision and Malwai accent was known as ‘Baain’. Thus Baain Wala ultimately became Barnala. Thus these are different views only but no historical detail is available that how name Barnala came into existence.
Barnala was named after Baba Ala Singh. Baba Ala Singh left Bhadaur with his elder brother (hometown of Patiala State) and settled at Barnala and conquered many areas with the help of his brothers the Bhadaur Sardars. Though it was a district headquarters in erstwhile princely state system, it was later merged in PEPSU (Patiala & East Punjab States Union) and degraded as sub divisional headquarters.

There is a stone "Rameshwaram Stone" in Nath Wala Dera – Village Handiaya Adjoining with Barnala that one floating in water.

Demographics

As per provisional data of 2011 census Barnala had a population of 116,449, out of which males were 62,554 and females were 53,895. The literacy rate was 79.59 per cent. Barnala is a Sikh majority city with approximately 50.37% of city population following Sikhism.

Economy
TridentGroup (formerly known as Abhishek Industries), is headed by Mr. Rajinder Gupta. The group operates in five major business segments: Yarn, Terry Towels, Paper, Chemicals and Captive Power. Trident is one of the largest yarn spinners in India, one of the world’s largest terry towel manufacturers and the world’s largest wheat straw based paper manufacturer.

IOL Chemicals and Pharmaceuticals (IOLCP) is a leading organic chemicals manufacturer and supplier.

Standard Combines headquartered in Barnala, is in various products like, Thresher, Self Harvester Combine, Tractor Driven Harvester Combine, Rotavator, Rotavator with Seed Drill, Maize Self Harvester Combine. The company is also exporting its 4x4 Harvester Combine & track Combine to Nepal, Sri-Lanka, Bangladesh.

Balkar Combines headquartered in Barnala, The company is in various products like, Thresher, Self Harvester Combine, Tractor Driven Harvester Combine, Rotavator, Rotavator with Seed Drill, Maize Self Harvester Combine. The company is also exporting its 4x4 Harvester Combine to Nepal, Sri-Lanka, Bangladesh.

Vedic Formulation Pvt Ltd  Ayurvedic medicine manufacturer GMP certified by dept.of Ayurved Punjab.A Chandigarh-based well known company has its own manufacturing plant at Sanghera Road, Barnala.

Barnala mainly acts as a market place for surrounding villages, including Hamidi. and also emerging as a trading town.

Notable residents
 
 
 Surjit Singh Barnala - politician who served as the chief minister of Punjab state 
 Ram Sarup Ankhi - Punjabi writer, novelist and poet
 Karam Singh - soldier who was the first living recipient of the Param Vir Chakra

Educational Institutions
 
List of educational institutions in Barnala:-

Schools:
 Aryabhatta International School
 B.G.S Public School
 BVM International School
 Dayanand Kendriya Vidya Mandir
 Gandhi Arya High School
 Gobind International Public School Bhadaur
 Government Boys S S School
 Government Girls S S School
 Government High Smart School Mauran
 Gurpreet Holy Heart Public School
 Kendriya Vidyalaya Air Force Station
 Little Angel Play-Way School
 Mother Teacher School
 Sacred Heart Convent School
 Sacred Heart convent senior secondary school
 Spring Valley Sr. Sec. School
 Sarvhitkari Senior Secondary School
 Sarvottam Academy
 Spring Dale Playway School
 Takshila Public school
 Y.S. Public School

Higher Education Institutions:
 Aryabhatta Group of Institutes
 Akal Polytechnic College
 Baba Farid Institute of Computer Science and Information Technology
 Barnala Polytechnic College
 Dashmesh Institute of Management and Technology
 Government Industrial Training Institute
 Guru Arjun Dev College of Management and Technology
 Guru Gobind Singh College of Education
 Guru Gobind Singh College Sanghera
 Guru Nanak Dev Nursing Institute
 L.B.S Arya Mahila College
 M.P. patwar training center
 S. D. College
 Sacred heart international college of education
 Technical Education College Handiaya
 University college Barnala

References

 
Cities and towns in Barnala district